Mekhongthelphusa is a genus of freshwater crabs in the family Gecarcinucidae, found in South-East Asia.

Species
 Mekhongthelphusa brandti (Bott, 1968): Thailand, Vietnam
 Mekhongthelphusa kengsaphu Naiyanetr & Ng, 1995
 Mekhongthelphusa neisi (Rathbun, 1902): Vietnam
 Mekhongthelphusa tetragona (Rathbun, 1902)

References

External links

Gecarcinucidae
Freshwater crustaceans of Asia